Keeling's Guide to Japan was a tourist guidebook published in several editions during the 19th century by the Yokohama-based firm, A. Farsari & Co. 

The full title is Keeling's Guide to Japan: Yokohama, Tokio, Hakone, Fujiyama, Kamakura, Yokoska, Kanozan, Narita, Nikko, Kioto, Osaka, Kobe, Etc. Etc.

The guidebook provided accurate and detailed maps and plans of Japanese cities, resort areas, and building complexes; descriptions of sites, services and suggested itineraries; numerous informative tables; and pages of advertisements (including one for the Farsari photographic studio). Given the degree of detail, the guide is useful even today as a resource for a better understanding of Japan in the second half of the 19th century.

References

 Baxley, George C. Baxley Stamps, Keeling's Guide to Japan. Accessed 22 December 2006.

Travel guide books
Books about Japan
19th-century books